William Aloysius "Bil" Keane (October 5, 1922 – November 8, 2011) was an American cartoonist most notable for his work on the newspaper comic The Family Circus. It began in 1960 and continues in syndication, drawn by his son Jeff Keane.

Early life and education
Keane was born in the Philadelphia, Pennsylvania neighborhood of Crescentville, and attended parochial school at St. William Parish and Northeast Catholic High School. While a schoolboy, he taught himself to draw by mimicking the style of the cartoons published in The New Yorker. His first cartoon was published on May 21, 1936, on the amateur page of the Philadelphia Daily News.  While in high school, his in-comic signature was spelled "Bill Keane", but early in his career, he omitted the second L from his first name "to be distinctive".

Career

Keane served in the U.S. Army from 1942 to 1945, drawing for Yank and creating the "At Ease with the Japanese" feature for the Pacific edition of Stars and Stripes.

Keane worked for the Philadelphia Bulletin as a staff artist from 1946 to 1959, where he launched his first regular comic strip Silly Philly. His first syndicated strip, Channel Chuckles, a series of jokes related to television, premiered in 1954 and ran until 1977.  In 1959, the Keane family moved to Paradise Valley, Arizona. Keane's daily newspaper panel The Family Circus premiered on February 29, 1960. Keane was the president of the National Cartoonists Society from 1981 to 1983 and was the emcee of the Society's annual awards banquet for 16 years.

From 1981 to 1983, Keane published the gag strip Eggheads in collaboration with his son Jeff, who now draws and writes The Family Circus and continues the strip with his own insight and humor. Like his father, Jeff Keane has been president of the National Cartoonists Society (NCS), serving two consecutive terms (four years).  The NCS is the organizing body that honors cartoonists with the Reuben Awards.

Personal life and death
While stationed in Australia he met Thelma "Thel" Carne. Bil and Thel were married in Brisbane, Queensland in 1948 and settled in Roslyn, Pennsylvania. Thel, the inspiration for the "Mommy" character in his long-running strip, died on May 23, 2008, from complications of Alzheimer's disease. They had five children: Gayle, Neal, Glen, Christopher and Jeff. Glen is an animator and has most notably worked for Walt Disney Animation Studios. Jeff is a cartoonist, having taken over his father's comic strip. 

Bil Keane died on November 8, 2011, at his home in Paradise Valley, Arizona (near Phoenix), at age 89.  The cause of death was given as congestive heart failure. He was buried, alongside his wife, in the Holy Redeemer Cemetery of Phoenix, Arizona.

Awards
Keane was a four-time recipient of the National Cartoonists Society's Award for Best Syndicated Panel, winning in 1967, 1971, 1973 and 1974. In 1981, he was awarded the Inkpot Award. In 1982, Keane was named the Society's Cartoonist of the Year and received its top honor, the Reuben Award. He also received the Elzie Segar Award in 1982 for his unique contribution to the cartooning profession. In 1998, he became the tenth recipient of the Arizona Heritage Award, joining—among others—Barry Goldwater, Sandra Day O'Connor, Mo Udall and Erma Bombeck.
Keane was honored with the Silver T-Square Award from the National Cartoonist Society in 2002 for "outstanding dedication" to the Society and the cartooning profession. In 2008, Keane was honored with the Sergio Award from the Comic Art Professional Society.

Friends

Keane had a close friendship with humorist and newspaper columnist Erma Bombeck. Keane provided illustrations for Bombeck's book Just Wait Until You Have Children of Your Own! (1972), and considered himself instrumental in convincing Bombeck and her family to move to Arizona near his home. In 1996, he was a pall bearer at Bombeck's funeral.

Stephan Pastis, creator of Pearls Before Swine, acknowledged he was good friends with Keane and Keane's son, Jeff. Pastis has notably parodied The Family Circus in his own strip a number of times, and Keane wrote a satirical "attack" on these jokes as a foreword for Pastis' Pearls collection Macho Macho Animals.

Keane switched with Scott Adams of Dilbert in the 1997 comic strip switcheroo. Adams said, "Bil was a misunderstood creative genius who knew how to write for his target audience. He was also a great guy. I was a big fan."

Keane also counted fellow cartoonists Charles M. Schulz (Peanuts) and Mell Lazarus (Miss Peach, Momma) as close friends.

In 1994, the characters from The Family Circus made a "guest appearance" in Bill Griffith's Zippy the Pinhead comic strip. Griffith said, "I remembered Bil's affection for Zippy, so I decided to bite the bullet and call him to ask if, instead of me parodying his strip, he'd agree to jam with me..." The characters were drawn into the strip by Keane, but the dialog was written by Griffith. Then, on March 7, 1995, Zippy made an appearance in a Family Circus panel, drawn in by Bill Griffith. Griffith said Family Circus was "the last remaining folk art strip." Griffith said, "It's supposed to be the epitome of squareness, but it turns the corner into a hip zone."

Books

Family Circus collections

The Family Circus (1961)
The Family Circus Vol. 1 (1965)
The Family Circus Vol. 2 (1966)
Sunday with the Family Circus (1966)
The Family Circus (1967)
I Need a Hug. (1968)
Peace, Mommy, Peace! (1969)
Wanna Be Smiled At? (1970)
Peekaboo! I Love You! (1971)
Look Who's Here! (1972)
Can I Have a Cookie? (1973)
Hello, Grandma? (1973)
At Home with the Family Circus (1973)
I'm Taking a Nap (1974)
When's Later, Daddy? (1974)
I Can't Untie My Shoes!  (1975)
 Dolly Hit Me Back! (1975)
Mine: And Yours, Too! (1975)
Jeffy's Lookin' at Me (1976)
Smile! (1976)
Not Me! (1976)
Quiet! Mommy's Asleep! (1977)
Sunday with the Family Circus (1977)
For This I Went to College? (1977)
Where's PJ? (1978)
Any Children? (1979)
Dolly Hit Me Back! (1979)
Not Me. (1980)
Daddy's Little Helpers (1980)
Good Morning, Sunshine!  (1980)
On Vacation with the Family Circus (1980)
Kittycat's Motor is Running! (1981)
Who Invented Rain? (1981)
My Turn Next! (1981)
Pasghetti and Meat Bulbs!  (1981)
That Family Circus Feeling (1982)
Go to Your Room! (1982)
It's Not Easy Bein' the Littlest (1982)
We'll Help You Get Better (1982)
Mommy, God's Here (1982)
PJ's Barefoot All Over! (1989)
I'm Already Tucked In (1983)
Pick Up What Things?  (1983)
Grandma Was Here (1983)
My Turn Next! (1984)
Love, The Family Circus (1984)
The Family Circus Parade (1984)
It's My Birthday Suit (1984)
I Dressed Myself! (1984)
How Do You Turn It on? (1985)
Unquestionably the Family Circus (1985)
Wanna Be Smiled at? (1985)
PJ's Still Hungry (1986)
Heart of the Family Circus (1986)
He Followed Me Home (1987)
The Family Circus's Colorful Life (1987)
We're Home! (1987)
Where Did the Summer Go? (1987)
I Could Hear Chewing (1988)
It's Muddy Out Today (1988)
Oops! We're Out of Juice (1988)
The Family Circus is Very Keane (1988)
Granddad! It's Morning! (1989)
We Didn't Do It! (1989)
Baby on Board (1989)
The Family Circus Memories (1989)
Behold the Family Circus (1989)
Quiet, Sam! (1990)
I Had a Frightmare! (1990)
I Just Dropped Grandma! (1990)
I'm Wearin' a Zucchini! (1991)
The Sky's All Wrinkled (1991)
It's Up and Let 'Em at Me (1991)
Through the Year with the Family Circus (1992)
Look! A Flutterby! (1992)
Are You Awake, Daddy? (1992)
I'll Shovel the Cards (1992)
Sam's Takin' a Catnap! (1992)
Enjoy Yourselves! (1993)
What Does This Say? (1994)
Stay! (1994)
Count Your Blessings (1995)
Sing Me a Loveaby? (1995)
Daddy's Cap Is on Backwards (1996)
The Family Circus by Request (1998)

Special compilations
The Family Circus Treasury, foreword by Erma Bombeck (1977)
The Family Circus Album, foreword by Charles Schulz (1984)
The Family Circus is Us (1990)
Family Circus Library, Vol. 1 by The Library of American Comics (2009)
Family Circus Library, Vol. 2 by The Library of American Comics (2010)

Other cartoon collections

Channel Chuckles (1964)
Jest in Pun (1966)
Pun-Abridged Dictionary (1968)
More Channel Chuckles (1971)
It's Apparent You're a Parent (1971)
Deuce and Don'ts of Tennis (1975)
Eggheads written by Bil Keane and Jeff Keane (1983)

Illustrated books
Just Wait Till You Have Children of Your Own! written by Erma Bombeck and Bil Keane (1971)
Hey, Father! written by Jeanne Marie Lortie, illustrated by Bil Keane (1973)
Daddy's Surprise Day written by Gale Wiersum, illustrated by Bil Keane (1980)
Ask Any Mother written by Jean B. Boyce, illustrated by Bil Keane (1991)
Just Ask Mom written by Jean B. Boyce, illustrated by Bil Keane (1996)
Just Like Home written by Jean B. Boyce, illustrated by Bil Keane (2001)

Footnotes

References

External links

Bil's biography at the Family Circus Website
Bil Keane biography at King Features Syndicate
Feature article on Bil Keane at St. Anthony Messenger Magazine Online
Bil Keane Cartoon collection of original cartoon artwork from 1954–1966 at Syracuse University's Special Collections Research Center.
 

1922 births
2011 deaths
United States Army personnel of World War II
Artists from Arizona
People from Abington Township, Montgomery County, Pennsylvania
People from Paradise Valley, Arizona
Artists from Philadelphia
Reuben Award winners
United States Army soldiers
American comic strip cartoonists
Catholics from Pennsylvania
Catholics from Arizona
Inkpot Award winners
Christian comics creators